Mitchell's Bay is a community in the regional municipality of Chatham-Kent, Ontario, located on the eastern shore of Lake St. Clair.

Communities in Chatham-Kent
Ontario populated places on Lake St. Clair